The First De Geer cabinet was the cabinet of the Netherlands from 8 March 1926 until 10 August 1929. The cabinet was formed by the political parties Roman Catholic State Party (RKSP), Anti-Revolutionary Party (ARP) and the Christian Historical Union (CHU) following the fall of the First Colijn cabinet on 11 November 1925.

Cabinet Members

 Retained this position from the previous cabinet.
 Resigned.

References

External links
Official

  Kabinet-De Geer I Parlement & Politiek

Cabinets of the Netherlands
1926 establishments in the Netherlands
1929 disestablishments in the Netherlands
Cabinets established in 1926
Cabinets disestablished in 1929